The Bombing Islands ( in Japan) is a puzzle video game developed and published by Kemco for the PlayStation. It was later re-released for Nintendo 64 as Charlie Blast's Territory (whose working title was Charlie Blast's Challenge) in North America on April 2, 1999, and in Europe on June 18, 1999. A cell phone game named "The Bombing Island" was also released in 2003 by Kemco, but with graphics from the game Bombuzal with the main character changed to Kid Clown.

Gameplay
The player controls the game's main protagonist and is tasked to demolish a series of bombs located on 60 islands, taking place across six different environments. He must use these bombs and other things located on each island to help him clear the bombs so he can proceed to the next island. An island has a single red detonator bomb, which must be grouped alongside other bombs in the level by pushing the bombs (excluding ones planted in the ground) before lighting the detonator bomb, which allows for all the bombs to explode and destroy the island. If the player is either caught in an explosion or fails to remove all the bombs in the level, they are forced to retry the level from the start. As the player advances, additional hazards are added to make the game more challenging, such as moving platforms, spikes coming through the ground, and slippery surfaces that prevent him from pushing bombs across. After each island is cleared the player has given a password which consists of five playing cards.

Story and other differences in the versions
In the PlayStation versions of the game, the main character is Kid Clown, from the earlier Kid Klown series of video games. He is given a message from the King Clown to rid the planet of the bombs on all six continents.

In the Nintendo 64 (N64) version, the hero is Charlie Blast, a demolition expert. His job is to clear the six rivers that have been dammed by the evil 'King of Industry'.

The play mechanics for both games are almost identical. However, in 'Bombing Islands' there is a step meter counting each step and move that Kid Clown makes. This earns the player Gold, Silver, Bronze or no medal. The N64 version doesn't have this step counting requirement. However, Charlie can jump without having to step on spikes to do so, while Kid Clown only jumps when having stepped on spikes. Some of the sixty levels in the game are the same from one version to the next. However, the graphics to both are completely different, even though the obstacles serve the same purpose with both versions.

Charlie Blast's Territory

The game was independently re-developed for the Nintendo 64 by Realtime Associates, and game designer Scott Kim. In the early days of the games production it was titled "Charlie Blast's Challenge". Besides changing the graphics, a four-player versus mode was also added wherein players can control Charlie or one of three other characters and must conquer as much of the land as possible with one's own bomb blasts. The multiplayer mode includes several bombs not featured in the main solo mode, like a freeze bomb, which when lit, will encase the other player(s) in blocks of ice, and a rainbow bomb, which is capable of exploding an entire row or column that the bomb is facing.

Reception

Charlie Blast's Territory received mixed reviews, while The Bombing Islands received unfavorable reviews, according to the review aggregation website GameRankings. GameSpot criticized the graphics and the sound of the former version, noting, "... this game seems like a generally decent puzzle game in a substandard package." IGN rated the game higher, and recommended it for hardcore puzzle gamers. GamePro also noted the lackluster presentation. Nintendo Power gave Charlie's Blast Territory a mixed review, a few months before the game was released Stateside. In Japan, Famitsu gave The Bombing Islands a score of 21 out of 40.

Notes

References

External links
 The official 'The Bombing Islands' Japanese webpage, for the PSP/PS3 version.
 Charlie Blast's Territory, text and video walkthrough, by "Teary Eyes" Anderson at Archive.org.
 
 

1997 video games
Kemco games
Nintendo 64 games
PlayStation (console) games
PlayStation Network games
Puzzle video games
Realtime Associates games
Multiplayer and single-player video games
Video games about clowns
Video games developed in Japan
Video games developed in the United States
Video games set on fictional islands
Video games about bomb disposal